Ede Mađar (28 July 1931 – 13 April 2005) was a Serbian gymnast. He competed in eight events at the 1952 Summer Olympics.

References

1931 births
2005 deaths
Serbian male artistic gymnasts
Olympic gymnasts of Yugoslavia
Gymnasts at the 1952 Summer Olympics
Sportspeople from Subotica